R95 may refer to:
 
 , a destroyer of the Royal Navy
 R95, a NIOSH air filtration rating